The Marquesan sardinella (Sardinella marquesensis) is a species of ray-finned fish in the genus Sardinella endemic to the Marquesas Islands.

Footnotes 
 

Marquesan sardinella
Fauna of the Marquesas Islands
Fish of Oceania
Marquesan sardinella